Leon de Wolff (26 September 1948 – 3 January 2014) was a Dutch journalist and media consultant and researcher.

Leon de Wolff died from multiple system atrophy (MSA) on 3 January 2014, aged 65, in Epse near Lochem, Gelderland.

References

1948 births
2014 deaths
Writers from Rotterdam
Dutch journalists
Dutch consultants
Market researchers
Neurological disease deaths in the Netherlands
Deaths from multiple system atrophy
Erasmus University Rotterdam alumni